Emmanuel Ifeanyi Ogude (born 29 March 1993) is a Nigerian professional footballer who plays as a forward for Danish 2nd Division club B.93.

Club career

B.93
Ogude signed a contract with Danish third tier B.93 in December 2015, at the age of 21, after playing in Israel for a few years. His debut for the first team was as a substitute against B1908 on 24 March 2016, a game which B.93 won 3–1. 

After being awarded the title of Player of the Year in the Danish third tier, Ogude attracted interest from Danish Superliga club Brøndby IF which resulted in a tryout.

Vendsyssel
On 7 July 2017, Ogude signed for Danish second tier club Vendsyssel FF on a three-year deal. He made his debut for Vendsyssel in a league match on 30 July 2017 against Fremad Amager, where he came on as a late substitute for Jeppe Illum. His first season at the club resulted in promotion to the Superliga. Ogude ended the season with 27 appearances in which he scored 10 goals.

Ogude made his first appearance at the highest Danish level on 15 July 2018, as a 82nd-minute substitute for Sebastian Czajkowski as Vendsyssel won 3–2 home over OB. He scored his first goal at the highest level from a penalty kick on 26 August in a 1–2 home loss to Brøndby IF. The penalty resulted in a controversial situation, where opposing supporters from Brøndby threw a football on the field with the intention of flinching Ogude at the moment of shooting. Ogude himself explained that he did not notice the episode, but that a lighter was thrown at him from the opposing fans. The incident resulted in a fine of 25,000 DKK for Brøndby. On 5 September, Ogude scored six goals as Vendsyssel crushed Danish sixth tier side Egen UI with a total score of 9–1. He finished the season with 27 appearances in which he scored nine goals, as Vendsyssel suffered relegation after one year at the highest level. The club confirmed on 12 August 2020, that Ogude had left the club.

Al Tadhamon
In September 2020, Ogude signed with Kuwait Premier League club Al Tadhamon. In the summer of 2021, Ogude tore his anterior cruciate ligament. His contract was not extended, making him a free agent in July 2021.

Return to B.93
In March 2022, Ogude returned to B.93.

References

External links
 

Living people
1994 births
Nigerian footballers
Nigerian expatriate footballers
Association football forwards
Danish 1st Division players
Danish 2nd Division players
Danish Superliga players
Kuwait Premier League players
Maccabi Petah Tikva F.C. players
Hapoel Ashkelon F.C. players
Maccabi Kiryat Gat F.C. players
Boldklubben af 1893 players
Vendsyssel FF players
Al Tadhamon SC players
Nigerian expatriate sportspeople in Israel
Nigerian expatriate sportspeople in Denmark
Nigerian expatriate sportspeople in Kuwait
Expatriate footballers in Israel
Expatriate men's footballers in Denmark
Expatriate footballers in Kuwait
Nigeria youth international footballers